Evo United is a football club based in Vientiane, Laos. They play in the Lao League, the top national football league in Laos.

Players and staff

Current squad

References

Football clubs in Laos